may refer to one of the following mountains in Japan:

Pinneshiri (Hidaka), a mountain of the Hidaka mountains in Samani, Hokkaidō
Pinneshiri (Kabato), a mountain of the Kabato mountains in Shintokukawa, Hokkaidō